This article is a list of notable individuals who were born in and/or have lived in Englewood, Colorado.

Academia
 Minor J. Coon (1921- ), biochemist
 David Crockett Graham (1884-1961), missionary, archaeologist

Arts and entertainment
 David Eugene Edwards (1968- ), musician
 Logan Miller (1992- ), actor
 Marshall Reed (1917-1980), actor

Business
 Louis W. Menk (1918-1999), railroad executive

Politics
 Carlotta Walls LaNier (1942- ), civil rights activist
 Ken Summers (1953- ), Colorado state legislator

Sports

Ice hockey
 Callan Foote (1998- ), defenseman
 Nolan Foote (2000- ), forward

Soccer
 Jordan Angeli (1986- ), defender, forward
 Robbie Derschang (1992- ), left winger
 Mark Lisi (1977- ), midfielder

Other
 Jimmy Bartolotta (1986- ), basketball guard
 Brad Lidge (1976- ), retired major league pitcher
 Jim Malloy (1932-1972), race car driver
 Chris Narveson (1981- ), baseball pitcher
 Grant Robison (1978- ), U.S. Olympic track and field distance runner
 Jeff Salzenstein (1973- ), tennis player
 Daniel Summerhill (1989- ), cyclist

References

Englewood, Colorado
Englewood